Fengjie County is a county of Chongqing Municipality, China. It is on the Yangtze River; located within a couple hundreds kilometers upstream from  the Three Gorges Dam, it is within the dam's affected area.

The county's most famous geographical feature is the Qutang Gorge, the first of the Yangtze's Three Gorges.

Notable karst phenomena, including the Xiaozhai Tiankeng sinkhole are located within the county.

It is the place where Still Life was shot, a film by Jia Zhangke that won the 2006 Venice Film Festival (Golden Lion).

History
The Fengjie county was established in 314 BC as Yufu County (魚復縣). In 649 AD, the name was changed to Fengjie, an reference to the loyalty of Zhuge Liang.

Geography 

Fengjie County is located in the northeast of Chongqing, bordering Wushan County in the east, Enshi City (Hubei) in the south, Yunyang County in the west and Wuxi County in the north. By the end of 2008, the population of the county is 1.04 million with male population of 540,000 persons, accounting for 51.9% and female population of 500,000 persons, accounting for 48.1%.

Climate

Administrative divisions 
Subdistricts:
 Yong'an Subdistrict, Yufu Subdistrict, Kuimen Subdistrict

Towns:
 Baidi, Caotang, Fenhe, Kangle, Dashu, Zhuyuan, Gongping, Zhuyi, Jiagao, Yangshi, Tuxiang, Xinglong, Qinglong, Xinmin, Yongle, Anping, Wuma, Qinglian

Townships:
 Yanwan Township, Ping'an Township, Hongtu Township, Shigang Township, Kangping Township, Taihe Tujia Township, Hefeng Township, Fengping Township, Chang'an Tujia Township, Longqiao Tujia Township, Yunwu Tujia Township

Economy

The GDP of Fengjie County ranked 25th among 40 county-level divisions (counties and districts) in Chongqing and 6th among all divisions in the northeast of Chongqing (11 counties and districts) in 2007. In 2007, the per capita net income of the peasants in Fengjie County is CNY 2,717.

It is known that the "collectively owned" land in Fengjie County were allocated the second time in 2005 after the first time in 1982-1983. Since then, the land has not been reallocated. Fengjie County Government encourages rural residents affected by development projects to become urban residents.

Migrant labor constitutes also an important part of the family income for the local rural residents. In some families, all the members are migrant labor. Their major occupations in urban areas cover restaurant operation, retailing and private business.

Agriculture 
The area of land cultivated is 58,933 ha and with a per-capita land area of 0.85 mu. The major crops grown in the area include rice, corn, potato, sweet potato, oil plant and vegetable and major animals raised include pigs, cattle, sheep, poultry and fish. Apart from conventional agriculture, cash cropping is also carried out such as the growing of tobacco, navel oranges, cotton, walnuts, and silkworm farming.

Transport
Fengjie has one Yangtze River crossing, the Fengjie Yangtze River Bridge.

Resettlement controversy 
Chen Maoguo (aka the "bird man", Chinese “”) protested against the low compensation received from relocation plans following the construction of a road entailing the demolition of his house. He was sentenced to prison for 3 years.

See also 
 Baidicheng

References

External links 

 Fengjie Travel Guide

 
County-level divisions of Chongqing